Bendor may refer to:

 Bendor Island, a French island in the Mediterranean Sea
 Bendor Range, a mountain range in British Columbia, Canada
 Bendor Grosvenor (born 1977), British art historian, writer and former art dealer
 Jan BenDor (born 1946), American women's rights activist

See also
 Bender (disambiguation)
 Bend Or (1877–1903), a British Thoroughbred racehorse
 John Bendor-Samuel (1929-2011), British evangelical Christian missionary and linguist